is an aerospace engineer, and former spouse of Japanese astronaut Naoko Yamazaki.

Biography
Yamazaki had an interest in space and spacecraft since junior school when was moved by the experience of seeing the Space Travel Section of the Smithsonian Institution in Washington, D.C.  Despite being shocked by the Challenger tragedy, he still wanted to someday travel in space.

Yamazaki was married to Japanese astronaut Naoko Yamazaki and they have two children. They divorced in February 2012.

References

1972 births
People from Kamakura
Japanese businesspeople
Living people